Logie Brae is a locality in the Riverina region of New South Wales, Australia.

Description

References

External links

Towns in New South Wales
Murrumbidgee Council